O-Crazy Luv is Keiko Yamada's first full-length album, and her first album under the name KCO. The album contains a total of 11 tracks including her first solo single as KCO, "Haru no Yuki", and its B-side, "Mobile Emotion". The album comes in two editions, normal and limited edition. Both have alternate album covers which only differ slightly. The limited edition is packaged with a DVD containing the PV for "Haru no Yuki" and offshoot footage. Despite being a track on the album, the PV for "O-Crazy Luv" was not included in the DVD. It became available for download via iTunes. All songs featured in the album were produced by Tetsuya Komuro.

Track listing

Singles
"Haru no Yuki" Release: 2008 March 12

2008 albums
Keiko (musician) albums